Cribbage King / Gin King is a 1989 video game published by The Software Toolworks.

Gameplay
Cribbage King / Gin King is a game in which the computer card game package can be either keyboard or mouse driven and can be customized.

Reception
Michael S. Lasky reviewed the game for Computer Gaming World, and stated that "Cribbage King is well worth its price. To have Gin King also included makes it a decided computer game bargain for any card shark."

Reviews
Amiga Joker - Apr, 1990

References

External links
Review in Compute!

1989 video games
Amiga games
Apple IIGS games
Classic Mac OS games
Digital card games
DOS games
The Software Toolworks games
Video games developed in the United States